Pearsall Ridge is a ridge, for the most part ice-covered, which extends east-northeast from Royal Society Range between Descent Pass and Covert Glacier, in Victoria Land. Named in 1992 by Advisory Committee on Antarctic Names (US-ACAN) after Richard A. Pearsall, who was a cartographer, member of the United States Geological Survey (USGS) geodetic control party to the Ellsworth Mountains in the 1979–80 season, and who contributed additional work during the season at South Pole Station, determining the true position of the Geographic South Pole.

Ridges of Victoria Land
Scott Coast